Jimmy Johnson (born 1956) is an American bass guitarist best known for his work with James Taylor, Allan Holdsworth, and Flim & the BB's. Raised in a rich musical environment, his father was a 47-year member of the Minnesota Orchestra's bass section, his mother a piano teacher and accompanist, and his brother Gordon is also a professional bassist.

In 1976, Johnson worked with Alembic and GHS to create one of the first 5-string bass guitars with a low B string.  Living in the Los Angeles area since 1979, Johnson continues to record and tour with singer-songwriter James Taylor and also appears with various groups at The Baked Potato jazz club in Studio City, California.

Selected discography
Jan Rivera – Existential Paranoia (2022)
 3rd Matinee – Meanwhile (1994)
 Chris Botti – Night Sessions (2001 – six tracks)
 Paul Brady – Trick or Treat (1992 – two tracks)
 Phil Buckle – Custom Made (2022)
 Dewa Budjana – Joged Kahyangan (2012), Surya Namaskar (2014)
 Dori Caymmi – Dori Caymmi (1988), Brazilian Serenata (1991)
 Billy Childs – Take For Example This (1988), Twilight Is Upon Us (1989), His April Touch (1991 – three tracks), I've Known Rivers (1994), Lyric (2005)
 Luis Conte – La Cocina Caliente (1988), Black Forest (1989), Marimbula (2007), Two Worlds (2010)
 Eddie Daniels – ...this is now (1991 – two tracks)
 DNA – Rick Derringer and Carmine Appice – Party Tested (1983)
 Flim & the BB's – Flim & The BB's (1978), Tricycle (1983), Tunnel (1984), Big Notes (1985), Neon (1987), The Further Adventures... (1988), New Pants (1990), Vintage/best of (2010), This Is A Recording (1992), Tricycle (SACD reissue) (1999)
 Fra Lippo Lippi - Light and Shade (1987 - three tracks)
 Brandon Fields – The Traveler (1988), Other Places (1989)
 The Steve Gadd Band – Gadditude (2013), 70 Strong (2015), Way Back Home: Live from Rochester, NY (2016), Steve Gadd Band (2018)
 Stan Getz – Apasionado (1990)
 Don Grusin – Raven (1990)
 Allen Hinds – Fact Of The Matter (2005), Falling Up (2008), Monkeys and Slides (2011), Fly South (2016)
 Roger Hodgson – In the Eye of the Storm (1984 – two tracks)
 Allan Holdsworth – I.O.U. Live (1984), Metal Fatigue (1985), Atavachron (1986), Sand (1987), Secrets (1989), Wardenclyffe Tower (1992), All Night Wrong (2002), Then! (2004), Against The Clock (2005), Tales From The Vault (2016 – one track only), Live in Japan 1984 (2018)
 Steve Hunt - Connections (2021 - two tracks)
 Gary Husband – Dirty & Beautiful, Vol. 1 (2010), Dirty & Beautiful, Volume 2 (2011)
 Elton John – The Road To El Dorado (2000 – three tracks)
 Wayne Johnson – Arrowhead (1980), Grasshopper (1983), Everybody's Painting Pictures (1984), Spirit of the Dancer (1988)
 Karizma – Cuba (1986), Arms of Love (1989), Perfect Harmony (2012 – 10 tracks)
 Oz Noy – Fuzzy (2007)
 Earl Klugh – Whispers and Promises (1989 – two tracks)
 Michael Landau – Tales From The Bulge (1990), Live 2000 (2000), Live (2006), Liquid Quartet Live (2020)
 Albert Lee – Gagged But Not Bound (1987)
 Kenny Loggins – December (1998)
 Lyle Mays – Eberhard (2021)
 Sérgio Mendes – Confetti (1984 – two tracks), Arara (1989), Brasileiro (1992 – two tracks), Oceano (1996)
 Vince Mendoza – Nights on Earth (2011)
 Dominic Miller – 5th House (2010)
 Nahuel Pennisi – Feliz (2017)
 Simon Phillips – Symbiosis (1995)
 Planet X – Moonbabies (2002),  Quantum (2007)
 Michel Polnareff – Enfin! (2018)
 Porcupine – Look, But Don't Touch (1993)
 Emily Remler – This Is Me (1990 - two tracks)
 The Rippingtons – Moonlighting (1986), 20th Anniversary (2006)
 Lee Ritenour – Harlequin (1985), Earth Run (1986), Color Rit (1989), Collection (1991)
 Draco Rosa – Frío (1994), Songbirds and Roosters (1998)
 Vonda Shepard – The Radical Light (1992)
 Derek Sherinian – Inertia (2001), Oceana (2011), The Phoenix (2020 - three tracks)
 Susie Suh – Susie Suh (2005)
 James Taylor – New Moon Shine (1991), Live (1993), Hourglass (1997), October Road (2002), James Taylor at Christmas (2004, 2006 – three tracks), Covers (2008), Other Covers (EP) (2009), Before This World (2015), American Standard (2020 - one track)
 Steve Tavaglione – Blue Tav (1990 – three tracks)
 Sadao Watanabe – Maisha (1985)
 Ernie Watts – Musician (1985)
 Chad Wackerman – Forty Reasons (1991), The View (1993), Dreams Nightmares and Improvisations (2012)
 Roger Waters – Amused to Death (1992)
 Gary Wright – Who Am I (1988 – four tracks)
 Yoshida Brothers – Renaissance (2004)

Selected individual tracks:
 Peter Cetera – "Even A Fool Can See" from the album World Falling Down
 Ray Charles – "If I Could" from the album My World
 Al Jarreau – "Something You Said" from the album Tomorrow Today
 Madonna – "I'll Remember" – (from the soundtrack of the film With Honors)
 Aaron Neville – "That's The Way She Loves" from the album Warm Your Heart
 Rod Stewart – "Broken Arrow" from the album Vagabond Heart

References

External links
Jimmy Johnson Entry on the Europe Jazz Network
[ Jimmy Johnson at Allmusic]

Living people
Guitarists from Minnesota
1956 births
American male bass guitarists
Place of birth missing (living people)
20th-century American bass guitarists
20th-century American male musicians
Flim & the BB's members